The Chapel of the Intercession Complex and Trinity Cemetery is the joint name given in the National Register of Historic Places for two adjacent and closely related, but separate, historic properties in Upper Manhattan, New York City:
 Church of the Intercession
 Trinity Church Cemetery and Mausoleum, one of three components of the Trinity Church Cemetery

The joint listing was inscribed on the National Register in 1980.

See also
 National Register of Historic Places listings in Manhattan above 110th Street

References

External links
 
 

Churches on the National Register of Historic Places in New York (state)